Edna G is a tugboat which worked the Great Lakes and is now preserved as a museum ship. Edna G was built by the Cleveland Shipbuilding Company in 1896 for the Duluth and Iron Range Railroad at a cost $35,397.50. She was named for the daughter of J. L. Greatsinger, president of the railroad.

Home-ported at Two Harbors, Minnesota, Edna G moved ships and barges carrying iron ore and taconite from the Mesabi Range and other smaller sites in the Iron Range region of northeast Minnesota. She spent her entire working career at Two Harbors with the exception of World War I (1917–1919) when she served on the eastern seaboard. She was out of service from 1931 to 1933 due to the depression.

Over the years Edna G was involved in several shipwreck rescues including the surviving crew of the Madeira. Her last tow was the Cason J. Calloway on December 30, 1980. She was the last coal-fired, steam-engine tug in service on the lakes when she was retired in 1981.

Edna G. is one of the attractions of the Lake County Historical Society in Two Harbors. Following reports of continued weakening of the hull though corrosion and exposure to ice, in January 2017 Two Harbors City Council initiated further studies of the viability of continuing her preservation ashore.

References

External links

Lake County Historical Society - Edna G. Tugboat

Museums in Lake County, Minnesota
Ships on the National Register of Historic Places in Minnesota
Museum ships in Minnesota
Duluth, Missabe and Iron Range Railway
Historic American Engineering Record in Minnesota
National Register of Historic Places in Lake County, Minnesota
Tugboats of the United States
1896 ships
Tugboats on the Great Lakes
Ships built in Cleveland